Va is a pair of Angkuic languages spoken in Mojiang Hani Autonomous County, Yunnan, China. Rather, Va constitutes a separate subdivision within the Angkuic languages.

Northern Va (about 2,000 speakers): spoken in Taihe Administrative Village 太和村, Jingxing Township 景星乡, Mojiang County, Yunnan, China. Northern Va is spoken by all generations, including children.
Southern Va (about 1,000 speakers): spoken in Zhenglong Administrative Village 正龙村, Jingxing Township 景星乡, Mojiang County, Yunnan, China. Southern Va is more endangered and is not spoken by children, but is also more phonologically conservative.

Distribution
Northern Va is spoken in about eight villages of Taihe Village 太和村, Jingxing Township 景星乡, Mojiang County, Yunnan.
Wamo 挖墨
Xinzhai 新寨 (Upper 上 and Lower 下)
Jiuzhai 旧寨
Dazhai 大寨 (Upper 上 and Lower 下)
Xiaozhai 小寨 (Upper 上 and Lower 下)

Southern Va is spoken in the following villages of Zhenglong Village 正龙村, Jingxing Township 景星乡, Mojiang County, Yunnan.
Pingtian 平田
Banglao 蚌老 (culture and language best preserved)
Miena 乜那
Binggu 丙故
Yin’gou 阴沟
Yakou 丫口 (culture and language least preserved)

References

 
 
 
  [Wamo dialect cited.]

Further reading

External links
 MSEA Languages – Va

Palaungic languages
Languages of Yunnan
Pu'er City